Neofaculta ericetella is a moth of the family Gelechiidae. It is found in Europe and Asia Minor.

The wingspan is 13–18 mm. The terminal joint of palpi shorter than second. Forewings from pale fuscous- grey to dark fuscous, sometimes whitish-sprinkled; a blackish spot in disc at 1/4; stigmata blackish, often elongate, partly white margined, first discal beyond plical; distinct black terminal dots; a more or less marked dark tornal spot. Hindwings over 1, light grey. The larva is dull greenish; dorsal and subdorsal lines pale dull reddish; 3 and 4 with dark red subdorsal spots; head pale brown; 2 whitish-green, grey-speckled.

The moths are on wing from April to July depending on the location.

The larvae feed on Calluna vulgaris, Erica cinerea and Rhododendron species.

References

External links
 Lepidoptera of Belgium
 Microlepidoptera.nl 
 UKmoths

Chelariini
Moths of Europe
Moths of Asia
Moths described in 1832